The APEC Business Travel Card (ABTC) is a travel document issued to business travellers who are citizens of APEC participating economies.  Valid for five years, the card eliminates the need for its holder to possess a visa when visiting other APEC participating economies as long as pre-clearance has been obtained during the application process.

Participating APEC economies and application process

Most APEC economies are full participating economies in the APEC Business Travel Card:

Transitional members:

Russia began full participation on 1 June 2013. 

Citizens of these economies can apply for a card from their national government, with the general criteria being business persons who may need to travel frequently on short term visits within the APEC region to fulfill business commitments. Different economies may have very different criteria for vetting applications from their own citizens; for example, Hong Kong accepts applications from all permanent resident bona fide business people, but Australia restricts participation to representatives of businesses engaged in international trade or investment between APEC economies, have received an Export Market Development Grant from Austrade in the past five years, are listed on the current Forbes Global 2000 business list, or meet other similar criteria.

After submitting an application, an applicant's name is circulated amongst the other participating economies which give entry pre-clearance when all conditions are met. The names of the economies for which entry pre-clearance has been given are printed on the card's reverse. It may take as long as three to four months for all member economies to respond to the pre-clearance queries from the applicant's government, as a result of which applicants may choose to have their card issued without waiting for some governments' dilatory responses and thus not enjoy travel privileges in those economies. For applications made after September 2015, the card is valid for five years (previously 3 years), after which a fresh application must be made. If the holder's passport is renewed during the 5 year validity period, the card must be reissued to reflect the new passport number. As of February 2014, there were roughly five hundred thousand ABTCs in active use.

Canada and the United States are transitional members. This permits them to issue ABTCs to their own citizens and nationals so that they can take advantage of expedited visa appointment and immigration clearance procedures in other economies, but without their citizens and nationals enjoying additional visa-free travel, or having to grant visa-free travel status to holders of APEC cards issued by other participating economies. The U.S. began accepting applications for ABTCs in June 2014, while Canada announced in October 2013 that it would begin a limited-participation trial programme.

It is also possible for a citizen of a third party country (including the United States and Canada) who is also permanent resident of Hong Kong to apply for an APEC card via the Hong Kong Immigration Department. This exception does not apply to any other member economies.

Physical appearance
The card is issued in creditcard form, is machine-readable  and has the following fields:
Name
Sex
Economy   [name of the member economy]
Date of Birth
Expiry Date
Signature
Passport number

Apart from the name of the member economy, no national signs are present on the card. On the back of the card, the member economies for which clearance has been approved are shown. The Machine-readable strip starts with "CP", followed by the abbreviation of the issuing economy. The abbreviations are in conformation with the 3-letter ISO 3166-1 alpha-3 country codes. Although Taiwan is a member economy under the name Chinese Taipei, the abbreviation TWN is used here.

Use
The card must be used in conjunction with a passport and has the following advantages:

 No need to apply for a visa or entry permit, as the card is treated as such (except by transitional members)
 Multiple short term entry for a maximum stay of between 59 days to 90 days
 Expedited border crossing in all member economies, including transitional members
 Expedited scheduling of visa interview (U.S.)
 Card is valid for five years
 Costs vary by participating country
 Processing time: 2–3 months, and up to one year in some cases. APEC offers a fast-track option for interim card issuance covering up to five "priority economies" of an applicant's preference.
 The Visa free arrangement does not apply to Chinese citizens of the Hong Kong Special Administrative Region for entry into the Mainland China. These citizens should continue to use the Mainland Travel Permit for Hong Kong and Macau Residents for such entry.It also does not apply to ABTC holders of Hong Kong for entry to Taiwan.

Country specific information

Australia
As Australia is a full participating member of the scheme, Australian citizens who are frequent bona fide business travellers can apply for a card through the Department of Home Affairs (Australia) online.  Foreign holders of the card can visit Australia visa-free for 90 days, and special fast-track lanes are available for them at Adelaide, Brisbane, Cairns, Darwin, Melbourne, Perth and Sydney airports.

Eligibility requirements for Australian citizens to get an ABTC include:
 You travel frequently to an APEC economy for business purposes
 You have not been convicted of a criminal offence
 Your business entity is engaged in international trade or investment between APEC economies.  This is shown if the business:
 has received an Export Market Development Grant from Austrade in the past five years
 has been a finalist in the Australian Export Awards in the past five years
 is listed on the current Forbes Global 2000 business list
 is trading goods, services or conducting investment activities between APEC economies
 is a start-up operation, there is clear evidence of viability, sound business planning, market research and product/s or services to be traded

Canada
Although Canada is not a full participant of the scheme, card holders are eligible to use special service lanes at major international airports upon arrival in Canada, but are still subject to the regular entry/visa requirements. At the APEC Indonesia 2013 summit, Canadian Prime Minister Stephen Harper announced that his country would begin a pilot scheme allowing Canadian citizen NEXUS members to apply for ABTCs.

In June 2014, the Canada Border Services Agency published a final rule regarding the issuance of ABTCs to Canadian Citizens. Applicants for ABTCs must already be enrolled in the NEXUS program. Applicants can apply through the GOES portal, the same US CBP operated website used for its other trusted traveler schemes.

Since Canada is only a transitional member of the ABTC scheme and does not grant any visa waiver to ABTC holders from other economies, Canadian citizens reciprocally do not enjoy any additional visa-free travel through the ABTC scheme. However, they qualify for expedited visa appointment procedures for those economies which require visas for Canadian citizens, and use of specially marked ABTC lanes at airports.

Hong Kong
All Hong Kong permanent residents who are bona fide frequent business travellers are eligible to apply for the card through the Immigration Department upon submission of form ID900, regardless of whether they are Chinese citizens, as long as they have never committed a criminal offence and have never been denied entry into another APEC participating economy.  The application fee is HKD540.

As Hong Kong is a full participant of the scheme, non-Hong Kong residents who hold an APEC Business Travel Card can enter Hong Kong visa-free for 60 days and are entitled to use special fast-track or resident counters.

Japan
Japan is a full member since 2003 and MOFA issues these cards to businessmen who are Japanese citizens. Popularly it is called as ABTC card. Visa free travel is allowed for either 60 or 90 days depending on the travel destination except for Philippines where the stay is limited to 59 days. Card holders can avail special fast-track lanes to expedite the immigration process. However, as Japanese passport already enjoys several visa-free travel perks, using this card may not always prolong the stay any further (ex: in case of travelling to Chile, South Korea or Taiwan) and rather using this card may reduce the period of stay (eg. travelling to Peru).

New Zealand
New Zealand citizens can apply for an ABTC if they travel frequently on business and are of a good character through Immigration New Zealand for NZD150.

As New Zealand is a full participant of the scheme, foreign cardholders can enter New Zealand visa-free for up to 90 days.

Russia 
Card holders are permitted to stay for business purposes for a maximum of 90 days in each period of 180 days.

United States
Although the United States is not a full participant in the scheme, card holders can use special fast-track lanes for aircrew at international airports in the United States, but they are still subject to regular entry/visa requirements.

Applicants for ABTCs must already be enrolled in Global Entry, NEXUS, or SENTRI. As the United States is only a transitional member of the ABTC scheme and does not grant any visa waiver to ABTC holders from other economies, U.S. citizens reciprocally do not enjoy any additional visa-free travel through the ABTC scheme. However, they qualify for expedited visa appointment procedures for those economies which require visas for U.S. citizens, and use of diplomatic or crew lines at airports. Among the 21 ABTC scheme member economies, the visa policies of China, of Russia, and of Vietnam require advance visas for U.S. citizens making short-term business visits, while visa policy of Papua New Guinea issues visas on arrival for a fee.  As of 3 January 2017, the fee is $70.

The Asia-Pacific Economic Cooperation Business Travel Cards Act was passed in November 2011 to authorize the issue of ABTCs to US travellers until September 2018. Implementation began shortly thereafter. In May 2014, the United States Department of Homeland Security published an interim final rule regarding the issuance of ABTCs to U.S. citizens.  In June 2014, U.S. Customs and Border Protection began accepting ABTC applications through the GOES portal, the same website used for its other trusted traveler schemes.  On November 2, 2017, prior to the September 2018 expiration of the temporary program, the Asia-Pacific Economic Cooperation Business Travel Cards Act of 2017 (S. 504) was signed making the APEC Business Travel Card a permanent program.

References

Asia-Pacific Economic Cooperation
Expedited border crossing schemes
International travel documents